Bella Voce may refer to:

 Bella Voce (group), a Chicago-based chamber chorus
 Bella Voce (album), a 2009 compilation album by Sarah Brightman